The Poacher's Pardon is a 1912 American silent film produced by Kalem Company and distributed by General Film Company. It was directed by Sidney Olcott with Alice Hollister, Jack J. Clark and J.P. McGowan in the leading roles.

Cast
 Jack J. Clark - Jim Warren
 Alice Hollister - Dora Wallace
 J.P. McGowan - Wallace
 Helen Lindroth

Production notes
The film was shot in England.

External links

 The Poacher's Pardon website dedicated to Sidney Olcott

1912 films
Silent American drama films
American silent short films
Films set in England
Films shot in England
Films directed by Sidney Olcott
1912 short films
1912 drama films
American black-and-white films
1910s American films
1910s English-language films
American drama short films